Scarness is a coastal suburb of Hervey Bay in the Fraser Coast Region, Queensland, Australia. In the  Scarness had a population of 3,519 people.

History 
The suburb was officially named by the Queensland Place Names Board on 12 April 1980. It was officially bounded on 25 June 1999.

In the  Scarness had a population of 3,519 people.

Amenities 
Hervey Bay Presbyterian Church is at 5 Denman Camp Road.

Hervey Bay Seventh Day Adventist Church is at 37 Hervey Street.

References 

Suburbs of Hervey Bay
Coastline of Queensland